USS Los Angeles was a rigid airship, designated ZR-3, which was built in 1923–1924 by the Zeppelin company in Friedrichshafen, Germany, as war reparations.  It was delivered to the United States Navy in October 1924 and after being used mainly for experimental work, particularly in the development of the American parasite fighter program, was decommissioned in 1932.

Design
The second of four vessels to carry the name USS Los Angeles, the airship was built for the United States Navy as a replacement for the Zeppelins that had been assigned to the United States as war reparations following World War I, and had been sabotaged by their crews in 1919.
Under the terms of the Treaty of Versailles Luftschiffbau Zeppelin were not permitted to build military airships.  In consequence Los Angeles, which had the Zeppelin works number LZ 126, was built as a passenger airship, although the treaty limitation on the permissible volume was waived, it being agreed that a craft of a size equal to the largest Zeppelin constructed during World War I was permissible.

The airship's hull had 24-sided transverse ring frames for most of its length, changing to an octagonal section at the tail surfaces, and the hull had an internal keel which provided an internal walkway and also contained the accommodation for the crew when off duty. Following the precedent set by LZ 120 Bodensee, crew and passenger accommodation was in a compartment near the front of the airship that was integrated into the hull structure. Each of the five Maybach VL I V12 engines occupied a separate engine car, arranged as four wing cars with the fifth aft on the centerline of the ship. All drove two-bladed pusher propellers and were capable of running in reverse. Auxiliary power was provided by wind-driven dynamos.

Operational history

The airship was commissioned into the US Navy on 25 November 1924 at Anacostia, D.C. with Lieutenant Commander Maurice R. Pierce in command. On its arrival in the United States, its lifting gas was changed from hydrogen to helium, which reduced payload but improved safety. At the same time the airship was fitted with equipment to recover water from the exhaust gases for use as ballast to compensate for the loss of weight as fuel was consumed, so avoiding the necessity to vent scarce helium to maintain neutral buoyancy.

Long-distance flights included return flights to Panama, Costa Rica and Bermuda. It served as an observatory and experimental platform, as well as a training ship for other airships.

On 25 August 1927, while Los Angeles was tethered at the Lakehurst high mast, a gust of wind caught her tail and lifted it into colder, denser air that was just above the airship. This caused the tail to lift higher. The crew on board tried to compensate by climbing up the keel toward the rising tail, but could not stop the ship from reaching an angle of 85 degrees, before it descended. The ship suffered only slight damage and was able to fly the next day.

In 1929, Los Angeles was used to test the trapeze system developed by the US Navy to launch and recover fixed wing aircraft from rigid airships.  The tests were a success and the later purpose-built s were fitted with this system.  The temporary system was removed from Los Angeles, which never carried any aircraft on operational flights. On 31 January 1930, Los Angeles also tested the launching of a glider over Lakehurst, New Jersey.

On 25 May 1932, Los Angeles participated in a demonstration of photophone technology. Floating over the General Electric plant in Schenectady, New York, the crew of the ship engaged in an on-air conversation with a WGY radio announcer using a beam of light.

As the terms under which the Allies permitted the United States to have Los Angeles restricted its use to commercial and experimental purposes only, when the U.S. Navy wanted to use the airship in a fleet problem in 1931 permission had to be obtained from the Allied Control Commission. Los Angeles took part in Fleet Problems XII (1931) and XIII (1932), although as was the case with all U.S. Navy rigid airships, demonstrated no particular benefit to the fleet.
 
She flew for a few more years and then retired to her Lakehurst hangar where she remained until 1939, when the airship was struck off the Navy list and was dismantled in her hangar. Los Angeles was the Navy's longest-serving rigid airship.

Gallery

Notes

Bibliography

 Althoff, William F. Sky Ships. New York: Orion Books, 1990. .
 Althoff, William F. USS Los Angeles: The Navy's Venerable Airship and Aviation Technology. Dulles, Virginia: Brassey's, 2004. .
 Hart, Larry. Pictures From the Past: A Schenectady Album. Schenectady, New York: Old Dorp Books, 1992. .
 Provan, John. LZ-127 "Graf Zeppelin": The story of an Airship, vol. 1 & vol. 2 (Amazon Kindle ebook). Pueblo, Colorado: Luftschiff Zeppelin Collection, 2011.
 Robinson, Douglas H., and Charles L. Keller. "Up Ship!": U.S. Navy Rigid Airships 1919–1935. Annapolis, Maryland: Naval Institute Press, 1982. .

External links

 Photo gallery of USS Los Angeles
 eZEP.de – a dedicated web portal for Zeppelin mail and airship memorabilia
 Zeppelin Study Group – a research group for airship memorabilia and Zeppelin mail
 USS Los Angeles (ZR-3) – page at Navy Lakehurst Historical Society
 Picture of the 25 August 1927 nose stand
 DANFS article on Los Angeles (ZR-3)
 Photo gallery at Naval Historical Center
 1925 eclipse footage shot from ship
 "Queen of Dirigibles Ready for U.S." May 1924, Popular Science Monthly excellent drawing showing size comparison between earlier dirigibles and battleships
 "Flying with an Airship Captain" Mar 1930, Popular Science Monthly Article detailing the operation of Los Angeles

1920s German aircraft
Los Angeles (ZR-3)
1920s United States military trainer aircraft
Zeppelins